Warton may refer to:

Places in England
Warton, Fylde, a village between Preston and Lytham St. Annes, Lancashire
Bryning-with-Warton, civil parish containing Warton
Warton Aerodrome, a BAE Systems airfield near the above village
Warton, Lancaster, a village in north Lancashire
Warton, Northumberland, a hamlet near Rothbury
Warton, Warwickshire

Other uses
Warton (surname), including a list of people with the name

See also
Wharton (disambiguation)